Michel Pouchard (born 23 January, 1938 in Avrillé-les-Ponceaux) is a French chemist specialising in the physico-chemistry of inorganic solids.

Biography 
After studying at the David high school in Angers and at the faculties of science at University of Rennes and University of Bordeaux, Michel Pouchard specializes in the physico-chemistry of inorganic solids: oxides of transition metals, electronic properties (magnetism, insulation-to-metal transition) and electrochemistry (materials for energy, membranes, electrodes for SOFC fuel cells in particular), nanocrystalline silicon) and in the science of functional materials.

Trainee then research associate at the CNRS from 1960 to 1967 (director of the materials technology dissemination department at the CNRS from 1975 to 1984), he was a lecturer at the Faculty of Sciences, University of Bordeaux from 1967 to 1970, then professor at the University of Bordeaux I from 1970 to 1992 (professor emeritus from 2004). From 1992 to 2002, he was a professor at the Institut universitaire de France (of which he was a director from 1993 to 1997).

He was elected a member of the French Academy of sciences on 16 November 1992. He is also a member of the Academy of Technologies, the French Society of Chemistry, the Academia europaea (1998) and the Leopoldina Academy (Germany) (2000).

Publications 
Michel Pouchard is the author of nearly 400 articles published in the best journals in solid-state chemistry and materials science and some fifteen patents.

Distinctions

Prices 
Langevin Prize of the French Academy of sciences (1977)

Decorations 
 Chevalier of the Légion d'honneur.
 Commandeur of the Ordre national du mérite. He was promoted to officier on May 15, 2017, and then obtained the rank of commandeur by decree on November 18, 2017.
 Commandeur of the Ordre des Palmes académiques.

References

1938 births
People from Indre-et-Loire
20th-century French chemists
Members of the French Academy of Sciences
French National Centre for Scientific Research scientists
University of Bordeaux alumni
Academic staff of the University of Bordeaux
Living people
21st-century French chemists
Recipients of the Legion of Honour
University of Rennes alumni
Inorganic chemists
Solid state chemists